Safi Khanlu (also Romanized as Şafī Khānlū) is a village in Qeshlaq Rural District, in the Central District of Ahar County, East Azerbaijan Province, Iran. At the 2006 census, its population was 73, in 15 families.

References 

Populated places in Ahar County